The SB-40 LAG is a 40 mm automatic grenade launcher developed and produced in Spain by the Empresa Nacional Santa Bárbara (EN SB) company (currently a part of the European Land Systems Group of General Dynamics).

Users
 : Used by Brazilian Marine Corps (Mounted on Piranha IIIC).
 : The Colombian Navy uses the SB-40 LAG grenade launcher installed on a turret on the ARC Juan Ricardo Oyola Vera riverine patrol boat.
 : Used by the Philippine National Police Special Action Force either on tripod or mounted on light utility vehicles, and by Philippine National Police Maritime Group mounted on patrol crafts 
 : used on M-11D scout cars (Panhard VBLs)
 : used by the Spanish Army (Ejército de Tierra de España), Spanish Navy Marines and Guardia Civil Española.

See also
Denel Y3 AGL - automatic grenade launcher used by South Africa.
Heckler & Koch GMG - A 40 mm automatic grenade launcher used by the German Army and other European armed forces.
XM174 grenade launcher, similar weapon
AGS-17, similar weapon, but smaller 30 mm calibre
Milkor MGL, another South African 40 mm grenade launcher
Mk 19 grenade launcher, similar weapon
XM307 (ACSW) (crew-served 25 mm autocannon)
XM25 CDTE (25 mm airburst personal weapon)
Comparison of automatic grenade launchers

References

Automatic grenade launchers
40×53mm grenade launchers
Weapons of Spain
Military equipment introduced in the 1980s